Dhur or D°ur (Dzongkha: དུར་; Wylie: dur) is a town in western Chhoekhor Gewog, Bumthang District in central Bhutan.

Dhur is the main area where Brokkat, one of the endangered languages of Bhutan, is spoken.

References

External links
Satellite map at Maplandia.com

Populated places in Bhutan
Bumthang District